Ryazansky Uyezd (Рязанский уезд) was one of the subdivisions of the Ryazan Governorate of the Russian Empire. It was situated in the northern part of the governorate. Its administrative centre was Ryazan.

Demographics
At the time of the Russian Empire Census of 1897, Ryazansky Uyezd had a population of 212,683. Of these, 98.6% spoke Russian, 0.4% Polish, 0.4% Ukrainian, 0.3% Yiddish, 0.1% German and 0.1% Tatar as their native language.

References

 
Uezds of Ryazan Governorate
Ryazan Governorate